Espoir Sportif de Hammam-Sousse, often referred to as ESHS is a football club from Hammam-Sousse in Tunisia. Founded in 1954, the team plays in yellow and black colors. Their ground is the Stade Municipal Bou Ali-Lahouar also called Stadium l'Arbi Lahwar, which has a capacity of 6,500.

H

 
Association football clubs established in 1954
Football clubs in Tunisia
1954 establishments in Tunisia
Sports clubs in Tunisia